(Helen) Diane Glancy (March 18, 1941) is an American poet, author, and playwright.

Life and career
Glancy was born in Kansas City, Missouri, to a Cherokee descent (non-enrolled) father and an English-German-American mother. At a young age, she had a hard time with determining her identity because of how her Indian lifestyle did not relate to what she was learning in school. Glancy decided to reclaim her Cherokee descent and found it easy to express in her poetry. She received her Bachelor of Arts (English literature) from the University of Missouri in 1964, then later continued her education at the University of Central Oklahoma, earning a Master's degree in English in 1983. In 1988, she received her Master of Fine Arts from the University of Iowa.

Glancy is an English professor and began teaching in 1989 at Macalester College in St. Paul, Minnesota, teaching Native American literature and creative writing courses. Glancy's literary works have been recognized and highlighted at Michigan State University in their Michigan Writers Series.

Awards
 American Book Award;
 Pushcart Prize;
 Capricorn Prize for Poetry;
 Native American Prose Award;
 Charles Nilon Fiction Award;
 Five Civilized Tribes Playwriting Prize
 North American Indian Prose Award
 The Minnesota Book Award in Poetry
 Oklahoma Book Award.
 Writer of the Year for Screenplays (2003-2004)
 Juniper Poetry Prize
 Cherokee Medal of Honor, issued by the Cherokee Honor Society, a husband-and-wife team
 North American Indian Prose Award

Works

Novels and prose works
Mary, Queen of Bees, Wipf & Stock (2017)
No Word for the Sea: A Novel of Alzheimer's, Wipf & Stock (2017)
One Of Us, Wipf & Stock (2015)
Ironic Witness, Wipf & Stock (2015)
Uprising Of Goats, Wipf & Stock (2014)
Reason for the Crows, U New York (2009)
Pushing the Bear: After the Trail of Tears, U Oklahoma Press: Norman (2009)
Stone Heart: A Novel of Sacajawea, Overlook Press (2003)
The Cold-and-Hunger Dance, U Nebraska Press (2002)
Designs of the Night Sky, U Nebraska Press (2002)
The Mask Maker: A Novel, U Oklahoma Press (2002)
The Man Who Heard the Land, Minnesota Historical Society Press (2001)
David: Taken from the New International Version of the Bible, IBS Publishing (2000)
Fuller Man, Moyer Bell Ltd. (1999)
The Voice that was in Travel, U Oklahoma Press (1999)
Flutie, Moyer Bell (1998)
Pushing the Bear, Harcourt Brace (1996)
The Closets of Heaven, Chax Press (1996)
Monkey Secret, TriQuarterly Books (1995)
The West Pole, Minnesota Center for Book Arts (1994)
Claiming Breath, U Nebraska Press (1992)
Trigger Dance, Fiction Collective Two (1990)
The Man Who Owns a Buffalo Trap, Central States University (1983)
The Woolslayer, Hadassah Press (1982)
Drystalks of the Moon, Hadassah Press (1981)
Traveling On, MyrtleWood Press (1980)

Poetry collections
Island of the Innocent: A Consideration of the Book of Job, Turtle Point Press (2020)
The Book of Bearings, Cascade Books, Wipf & Stock (2019)
It Was Over There By That Place, The Atlas Review (2019)
The Keyboard Letters, The Poetry Society of Texas (2017)
The Collector of Bodies: Concern for Syria and the Middle East, Wipf & Stock (2016)
Report to the Department of the Interior, University of New Mexico Press (2015)
It Was Then, Mammoth Publications (2012)
Stories of the Driven World, Mammoth Publications (2010)
Asylum in the Grasslands, University of Arizona Press (2007)
Rooms, New and Selected Poems, Salt Publishing, EarthWorks Series (2005)
Primer of the Obsolete, University of Massachusetts Press (2004)
The Shadow’s Horse, University of Arizona Press (2003)
In-Between Places, University of Arizona Press (2001)
The Stones for a Pillow, National Federation of State Poetry Societies Press (2001)
The Relief of America, Tia Chucha Press (2000)
(Ado)Ration, Chax Press (1999)
The Closets of Heaven, Chax Press (1999)
Asylum in the Grasslands, Moyer Bell (1998)
Boom Town, Black Hat Press (1997)
Two Worlds Walking, New Rivers Press (1996)
Coyote’s Quodlibet, Chax Press (1995)
The West Pole, Minnesota Center For Book Arts (1997)
The Only Piece of Furniture in the House, Moyer Bell (1996)
Red Moon Walking Woman, Just Buffalo Literary Center (1995)
Lone Dog’s Winter Count, West End Press (1991)
Iron Woman, New Rivers Press (1990)
Offering: Poetry and Prose, Holy Cow! Press (1988)
One Age in a Dream, Milkweed Editions (1986)
Brown Wolf Leaves the Res, Blue Cloud Quarterly (1984)
House on Terwilliger. House on Twenty-Fourth Street, Hadassah Press (1982)
Red Deer, MyrtleWood Press (1982)
What do People do West of the Mississippi?, MyrtleWood Press (1982)
The Way I Like to See a Softball Mitt, Hadassah Press (1981)

Plays
The Woman Who Was a Red Deer Dressed for the Deer Dance (1995)
The Best Fancy Dancer the Pushmataha Pow Wow's Ever Seen (1996)
War Cries: A Collection of Plays, Holy Cow Press (1997)
American Gypsy: Six Native American Plays, U Oklahoma Press (2002)
Cargo, Alexander Street Press (2006)
The Collector of a Three-Cornered Stamp, Alexander Street Press (2006)
The Conversion of Inversion, Alexander Street Press (2006)
The Distant Cry of Betelgeuse,  Alexander Street Press (2006)
Man Red, Alexander Street Press (2006)
The Words of My Roaring,Alexander Street Press (2006)

Non-fiction
Freeing the First Amendment: Critical Perspectives on Freedom of Expression, New York U Press (1995)
Naming Myself: Writings on Identity, Macalester College (1995)

See also
List of writers from peoples indigenous to the Americas
Native American Studies

References

Further reading
The Salt Companion to Diane Glancy, ed. James Mackay. Cambridge: Salt, 2010. .  (Full text of final proofs available here).

External links
 
 Diane Glancy's page at Macalester College
 Diane Glancy's page on NativeWiki.org
 Diane Glancy's entry at the Internet Public library
 Diane Glancy's entry at Voices from the Gaps
 Interview and readings at Michigan U
 A Trellis in the Snow (poem)

1941 births
Living people
American people who self-identify as being of Native American descent
Iowa Writers' Workshop alumni
Macalester College faculty
Writers from Kansas City, Missouri
University of Missouri alumni
University of Central Oklahoma alumni
American women dramatists and playwrights
20th-century American women writers
21st-century American women writers
20th-century American dramatists and playwrights
21st-century American dramatists and playwrights
20th-century American novelists
21st-century American novelists
20th-century American poets
21st-century American poets
American women poets
American women novelists
Novelists from Missouri
American Book Award winners
Novelists from Minnesota
American women academics